Beko (stylized as beko) is a Turkish major appliance and consumer electronics brand of Arçelik A.Ş., controlled by Koç Holding.

History

Beko Elektronik A.Ş. was founded by Vehbi Koç, the founder of Koç Holding (who also founded Arçelik A.Ş., the parent company of Beko, in 1955), and Leon Bejerano in Istanbul, Turkey in 1954. The company's name is a combination of the first two letters of the founders' surnames.

In 2004, Beko Elektronik purchased the German electronics company Grundig and by January 2005, Beko and its rival Turkish electronics and white goods brand Vestel accounted for more than half of all TV sets manufactured in Europe.

In April 2010, the electronics division of Beko renamed itself Grundig Elektronik A.Ş.

At the Extraordinary General Shareholders Meeting of Arçelik A.Ş. on 29 June 2009, it was decided to merge Arçelik A.Ş. with the company's subsidiary, Grundig Elektronik A.Ş. (to be administered directly by Arçelik A.Ş. of Koç Holding) by taking over all of Grundig's assets and liabilities as a whole.

Beko is a budget brand name in some countries and continues to be in use for a number of Arçelik A.Ş. products such as television sets, refrigerators, washing machines and dishwashers, in several countries.

Beko changed its old logo for a new one in June 2014.

Beko started selling its products in Egypt in 2014, where it is gaining popularity and more market share.

In India, Voltas, originally an air-conditioner brand and subsidiary of Tata Group, partnered with Beko to produce home appliances like TVs, dishwashers, washing machines, etc.

Incidents
Some Beko products have posed a safety risk to consumers who buy them. In 2016, Mishell Moloney was found dead due to a fault with a Beko drying machine that had caught fire. Beko tried to state that the fault that led to Moloney's death was a 'tragic and isolated incident.' However, the DCS 85W drying machine which was used by Moloney was already responsible for some twenty fires in the UK. Beko quality control chief, Andrew Mullin, also revealed that the smaller models in the range, had already been recalled due to hundreds of safety incidents.

Sponsorships
Beko has been the official sponsor of the Turkish, Italian and Lithuanian premier basketball leagues, as well as the 2014 FIBA Basketball World Cup in Spain. Beko is a partner of the Spanish football club FC Barcelona since 2014 and Turkish football club Beşiktaş JK, Turkmen football club FC HTTU. Furthermore, it had been one of the largest advertisers in the English Premier League since 2008, and an official sponsor of the FA Cup. Beko sponsored Millwall F.C. in the 2005–06 season.

Between 2016 and 2020, Beko was the main sponsor of Netball New Zealand's National Netball League.

Beko is a premier sponsor of Volley Lube.

References

External links
 Beko – International
 Beko - Turkey 
 Beko UK

Electronics companies established in 1969
Companies disestablished in 2009
Manufacturing companies based in Istanbul
Companies listed on the Istanbul Stock Exchange
Home appliance manufacturers of Turkey
Electronics companies of Turkey
Home appliance brands
Turkish brands
Koç family
Turkish companies established in 1969